The Logie for Most Popular Entertainment Program is an award presented annually at the Australian TV Week Logie Awards. It recognises the popularity of an Australian light entertainment program from various formats including comedy, talent, variety, music, talk, and traditional game shows.

It was first awarded at the 28th Annual TV Week Logie Awards, held in 1986 when the award was originally called Most Popular Australian Light Entertainment Program.  Over the years, it has been known as Most Popular Light Entertainment Program (1987–1988, 1993–2014), Most Popular Light Entertainment or Comedy Program (1989–1992), Most Popular Entertainment Program (2015) and Best Entertainment Program (2016-2017). From 2018, the award category name was reverted to Most Popular Light Entertainment Program.

The winner and nominees of this category are chosen by the public through an online voting survey on the TV Week website. Hey Hey It's Saturday holds the record for the most wins, with nine, followed by Rove with six wins.

Winners and nominees

Multiple wins

See also
 Logie Award for Most Popular Comedy Program

References

External links

Awards established in 1986